Eduardo Souza Reis or simply Esquerdinha (born 9 January 1984, in Montanha), is  a Brazilian footballer who plays as a midfielder.

1984 births
Living people
Brazilian footballers
Association football midfielders
Fluminense FC players
Associação Atlética Internacional (Bebedouro) players
Esporte Clube Bahia players
Associação Desportiva Cabofriense players
Paysandu Sport Club players
OFC Vihren Sandanski players
Grêmio Esportivo Brasil players
Nacional Esporte Clube (MG) players
Boa Esporte Clube players
Itumbiara Esporte Clube players
Associação Atlética Anapolina players
Paulista Futebol Clube players
Guarani FC players
River Atlético Clube players
Campeonato Brasileiro Série A players
Campeonato Brasileiro Série B players
Campeonato Brasileiro Série C players
First Professional Football League (Bulgaria) players
Brazilian expatriate footballers
Brazilian expatriate sportspeople in Bulgaria
Expatriate footballers in Bulgaria